Davey Ryan Edward Langit (born December 20, 1986) is a singer-songwriter and instrumentalist who kicked off his music career during Pinoy Dream Academy's first season (2006). He honed his singing and songwriting prowess during his stint writing songs like Dinggin, Sikat Ako (PDA Album Vol.2 and 4 respectively), Spending My Life With You, Awit Para Sa Kanya and also wrote Yeng Constantino's hits Cool Off and Time In (from the album Salamat). He then merged with fellow scholars to form the short lived Cebalo band which re-arranged and performed Pinoy Ako for PBB's second season.

Davey also wrote songs for the movies Katas Ng Saudi (2007 MMFF – "Sa Aking Pag-Uwi") and Magkaibigan (2008 MMFF – "Kaibigan"). His successive exposure to the gig scene further enhanced his stage play leading to him signing with Viva Records in June 2009 – hence the creation of Mad About Acoustic (2009), Lovex2 (2010 – with Raffi Quijano) and Mad About Acoustic 2; ukulele versions (2011) under the supervision of Sunny Ilacad. Poker Face and Jai Ho are some of the hits he re-created.

Davey wrote and arranged songs for other artists as well. He has contributed "You Still Have My Heart" for Princess Velasco's Addicted to Acoustic 2, "Bestfriend" for Yssa Alvarez]]' Addicted to Acoustic album, and "The Love Song" for their duet album together with Raffi Quijano.

In 2013, the Selfie Song was released on YouTube and created underground noise from the get go. The viral cellphone video caught the attention of the internet which led to a music video collaboration with Jamich. The said song became such a huge hit that it became number one on 22 radio stations here and abroad. This also led to Davey being thrust into the national media spotlight yet again after TV, radio social media based guestings, gigs and events went pouring in thereafter. The video now has 8 million views and counting.

Davey is one of the finalists in the Philippines' biggest songwriting competition, the Philippine Pop Music Festival (Philpop 2014) with his song "NGSB" (No Girlfriend Since Break) interpreted by Luigi D'avola.

Later that year, he released The Wedding Song, which was famously known for using the classic wedding march theme on its chorus. The song was then used and performed on various weddings thereafter. The song also has 600,000 views to date.

He is currently one of the hosts in Net 25's daily morning show, "Pambansang Almusal"

And in September 2014, Davey signed with Alcasid Total Entertainment & Artist Management Inc. also known as ATEAM, a new talent management spearheaded by OPM icon, Ogie Alcasid.

He is also a radio jock for Pinas FM, an all-OPM radio station operated by the Eagle Broadcasting Corporation.

Davey, an active member of the Iglesia ni Cristo, hosted the 1st INCinema Excellence in Visual Media Awards (EVM Awards) last October 2013 and the 2nd edition of it as well with Nikki Veron Cruz on October 31, 2014 at the Philippine Arena.

On the 2015 edition of the Philippine Popular Music Festival, Davey grabbed 1st runner up honors for his song "Paratingin Mo Na Siya".

And the following year, his song Dalawang Letra interpreted by the Itchyworms won Grand Prize on Himig Handog P-Pop Love Songs 2016.

Now also a household name on the songwriting and jingle writing circuit, Davey continues to perform all across the country, and is about to release a thirteen cut, all original album that will be distributed by Star Music Inc.

Singles

References

1986 births
21st-century Filipino male singers
Living people
Pinoy Dream Academy participants
Members of Iglesia ni Cristo
Star Magic
Place of birth missing (living people)